Per Johnsen (2 September 1926 – 29 July 2018) was a Norwegian sprint canoer who competed in the early 1950s. At the 1952 Summer Olympics in Helsinki, he was eliminated in heats of the K-1 1000 m event.

References
Per Johnsen's profile at Sports Reference.com
Per Johnsen's obituary 

1926 births
2018 deaths
Canoeists at the 1952 Summer Olympics
Norwegian male canoeists
Olympic canoeists of Norway